Prague 12 is a municipal district (městská část) in Prague, Czech Republic. It consists of the following cadastral subdivisions: Cholupice, Kamýk, Komořany, Modřany and Točná.

The administrative district (správní obvod) of the same name consists of municipal districts Prague 12 and Libuš.

See also
Districts of Prague#Symbols

External links 
 Prague 12 - Official homepage

Districts of Prague